Yesterday's Gone is the debut studio album by English hip hop artist Loyle Carner. It was released via Virgin EMI Records on 20 January 2017.

Critical reception
Yesterday's Gone received widespread acclaim upon its release. At Metacritic, which assigns a weighted average score out of 100 to reviews from mainstream critics, Yesterday's Gone holds an average score of 84 based on nine reviews, indicating "universal acclaim". NME described the album's style as "confessional, soul-searching, and very very good."

The album was nominated for the 2017 Mercury Prize and included on numerous end-of-year lists, ranking at number one on The Independents list of the 30 best albums of 2017.

In 2019, "No CD" became the theme tune of the BBC comedy discussion show The Ranganation, hosted by Romesh Ranganathan.

Year-end lists

Track listing
Track listing and credits adapted from Tidal and Qobuz.

Notes
  signifies an additional producer

Sample credits
 "The Isle of Arran" contains a sample of the recording "The Lord Will Make A Way" performed by S.C.I. Youth Choir.
 "Mean It in the Morning" contains elements of the song "Ladybird" by Brian Bennett.
 "Ain't Nothing Changed" contains a sample of the recording "Ricordandoti" performed by Piero Umiliani.
 "Sun of Jean" contains samples of "Drifter" and "This Is The Police", both written and performed by Steven Vengeance.

Charts

Certifications

References

External links
 

2017 albums
Albums produced by Kwes
AMF Records albums
Loyle Carner albums
Virgin EMI Records albums